Unlistenable Hymns of Indulgent Damage is the debut studio album of Angel Rot, released on April 23, 1999 by Man's Ruin Records. The album was recorded in 1993 but delay in releasing the sessions occurred when the master tapes were lost.

Reception

Eduardo Rivadavia of Allmusic awarded Unlistenable Hymns of Indulgent Damage three out of five stars, praising the guitar work but criticizing the songwriting as lackluster. He called it "one of the most unique-sounding and grammatically challenged stoner rock albums issued in 1999, even by the underground genre's already unconventional standards." Impact Press also criticized the vocal performances but generally agreed on the music being enjoyable.

Track listing

Personnel
Adapted from the Unlistenable Hymns of Indulgent Damage liner notes.

Angel Rot
 Mike Davis – bass guitar, production
 Tom Five – lead vocals, guitar, production, illustrations, design
 Steven Kleiner – drums, illustrations

Production and design
 Ross Bonadonna – mixing
 Sal Canzonieri – production
 Alan Douches – mastering
 Ira Heaps – production

Release history

References

External links 
 Unlistenable Hymns of Indulgent Damage at Bandcamp
 

1999 debut albums
Man's Ruin Records albums